A formal description of an alien language in science fiction may have been pioneered by Percy Greg's Martian language (he called it "Martial") in his 1880 novel Across the Zodiac, although already the 17th century book The Man in the Moone describes the language of the Lunars, consisting "not so much of words and letters as tunes and strange sounds", which is in turn predated by other invented languages in fictional societies, e.g., in Thomas More's Utopia.

Understanding alien languages
As the science fiction genre developed, so did the use of the literary trope of alien languages.

Some science-fiction works operate on the premise that alien languages can be easily learned if one has a competent understanding of the nature of languages in general. For example, the protagonist of C. S. Lewis's novel Out of the Silent Planet is able to use his training in historical linguistics to decipher the language spoken on Mars.

Others work on the premise that languages with similarities can be partially understood by different species or could not understood at all.

 Stanislaw Lem's novel His Master's Voice describes an effort by scientists to decode, translate and understand an extraterrestrial transmission. The novel critically approaches humanity's intelligence and intentions in deciphering and truly comprehending a message from outer space.
 The 2014 novel Lamikorda by D. R. Merrill not only deals with differences in verbal communication, but gestures and other "body language", pointing out the inextricability of language with cultural and social norms.

A number of long-running franchises have taken the concept of an alien language beyond that of a scripting device and have developed languages of their own. 
 Examples include the Klingon language of the Star Trek universe (a fully developed constructed language created by Marc Okrand)
 The Zentradi language from the Macross Japanese science-fiction anime series
 The DC Comics, Kryptonese (for which there exists an alphabet and language glossary)
 In the world of Transformers, the official language of their planet, Cybertron is Cybertronian. It made its debut in the 1984 episode, "Cosmic Rust". But, it wasn't until the 2007 movie, the language was given sound by the Decepticons. The language primarily consists of words and robotic sounds. 
 For his 2009 science fiction film Avatar, creator and director James Cameron constructed the fictional Na'vi language (with the aid of college professor Paul Frommer) for his fictional alien Na'vi race in the film

The existence of alien languages and the ease or difficulty of translation is used as a plot device or script element in a number of franchises, sometimes seriously, and sometimes for comedic value. 
 In Star Trek VI: The Undiscovered Country, the crew is forced to speak (broken) Klingon without the universal translator. 
 In the film Mars Attacks!, the language spoken by the Martians appears to consist only of the words "ack!" and "rack!" spoken at different pitches and volume. The film's universal translator consistently translates these as being offers of friendship despite the fact that the aliens' actions are anything but friendly. 
 In the Babylon 5 episode "Into the Fire", Commander Susan Ivanova gives orders to a Minbari crew in their language, and exclaims "Ah Hell!" in frustration, inadvertently giving the command "continuous fire" in Minbari. This is identical phonetically to ahel, which means 'continuous fire' in Minbari.
 In Dragon Ball Z, Bulma speaks in her usual language (Japanese) and thereby involuntarily activates some functions of an alien starship, as her words are identified by the ship's computer as Namekkian orders.
 C. J. Cherryh's Chanur series of books relies heavily on linguistic and psychological problems of communication between various alien races. Some examples include usage of obscure languages and cultural references to conceal information from others, imperfections of computer translation, use of pidgin and linguistic barriers, psychological concepts which do not have matches in other races' languages, and a race so alien that it cannot be understood at all without a translation by another race which itself can barely be understood due to manifold meanings in each message. In the Foreigner universe, Cherryh explores the interface between humans and Atevi, whose language relies on numerical values, causing the main character, Bren Cameron, to constantly calculate as he speaks the Atevi language, Ragi.
 Conversely, in The Simpsons, the fact that English is mutually understood by the show's human and alien characters is noted as being "an astonishing coincidence".
 Some stories, however, have alien beings speak near-unpronounceable tongues. Clark Ashton Smith, in one tale, has the sorcerer Eibon struggle to articulate the name of an alien, Hziulquoigmnzhah.
 In Mary Doria Russell's philosophical/sci-fi novel The Sparrow, a linguist who travels to an alien planet as part of a Jesuit mission discovers a language with unique and (at first) incomprehensible tenses and conjugations.
 In Carl Sagan's novel Contact (and the subsequent film adaptation), a broadcast from an extraterrestrial source is discovered to contain multiple layers of encrypted messages. 
 Ted Chiang's short story "Story of Your Life" describes attempts to communicate with a technologically advanced alien species that has no apparent understanding of basic mathematics and physics.
 Sheila Finch published a collection of short stories about first contact and alien communication, The Guild of Xenolinguists (Golden Gryphon Press), in 2007.
 In 2008, the game Dead Space introduced a form of alien language known as Unitology, for the religion that mainly uses it. Unitology is only shown to be written with no example or indication of a verbal dialect.
 In Futurama, a language exists called Alienese, which originates from an unspecified extraterrestrial source. At least one character has achieved an academic degree in xenolinguistics, which gives her the apparently rare skill of knowing how to translate between English and Alienese.
 In the 2016 science-fiction movie, Arrival, a linguist is tasked by the U.S. Army to try and understand an alien language of complex symbols. The film received significant media attention for its unique and detailed portrayal of what human communication with aliens might resemble.
 Various works from the Cthulhu mythos of H.P. Lovecraft present short sentences, excerpts and text fragments in the language of the Great Old Ones gods, referred to as "R'lyehian" or "Cthuvian" by the fan base. Lovecraft provided translations for some of the texts and denoted Cthuvian as a thick, guttural language, but he never published any details on pronunciation and grammar, so it is not possible to communicate in Cthuvian. Based on the limited text resources, only few grammatical rules and vocabulary could be worked out by fans, which are mostly guesswork. There is no evidence that Lovecraft even had a concept for the structure of the language when writing it.
 Robert Sheckley's novelette "Shall We Have a Little Talk?" describes a language that mutates so drastically and so frequently that it completely defeats an attempt of an Earth emissary, a professional intuitive linguist, to arrange a "peaceful" takeover of the planet: to buy some property, then to bring troops to protect the property, etc. But the first step is to learn the alien language in order to write ironclad contracts, which turns out to be impossible: the language changes faster than the Earthling can learn it.
 In China Miéville's novel Embassytown, humans co-exist on the planet Arieka with the indigenous, enigmatic Ariekei—otherwise known as the Hosts. Only genetically engineered human twins known as Ambassadors can speak the language of the Hosts (referred to only as "Language"), as it requires the orator to speak two words at once. The Ambassadors speak with two mouths and one mind and as such can be understood by the Ariekei, allowing for trade in their valuable biotechnology. However, the arrival of a new Ambassador who has not been genetically engineered to speak Language, yet can still manage to, radically alters the status quo. The speech of the new Ambassador intoxicates the Hosts and results in the entire Ariekei population becoming addicted to the Ambassador's speech to the extent that they cannot live without it.
 In the 2016 science fiction film Arrival, alien language is a main part of the plot.

Bypassing the issue of language

Universal translators
In some cases, authors avoid linguistic questions by introducing devices into their stories that seamlessly translate between languages, to the point that the concept of different languages can largely be excluded from the narrative. Notable examples include: 
 Douglas Adams's babel fish
 The TARDIS from Doctor Who
 The translator microbes in Farscape
 The universal translator from Star Trek

Universal language
In some cases, the question of language is dealt with through the introduction of a universal language via which most, if not all, of the franchise's species are able to communicate. In the Star Wars universe, for example, this language is known as Basic and is spoken by the majority of the characters, with a few notable exceptions. Other alien species take advantage of their unique physiology for communication purposes, an example being the Ithorians, who use their twin mouths, located on either side of their neck, to speak in stereo.

In some franchises this universal language is an intermediary language; one that different species can easily translate to and from their own languages, thus allowing simple communication between races. Examples of this approach include Interlac from the Legion of Super-Heroes, Babylon 5, and the Uplift Universe, where numerous sapient species use at least twelve "Galactic" languages (each version is used in communication between species that can articulate it, and that find it useful in expressing their concepts).

Not all of these universal/intermediate languages take the form of spoken/written languages as is recognized in the human world. In the film and book Close Encounters of the Third Kind scientists use Solresol, a language based on musical tones, while in the film and book Contact, aliens send the instructions to build a machine to reach them using mathematics, which the main character calls "the only universal language". Similarly, in Stargate SG-1, the protagonists encounter a galactic meeting place where different races communicate with one another using a language based on atomic structures which is "written" in three dimensions rather than two.

Telepathy
Some science fiction stories imagine communication through telepathy. 
 In addition to their spoken language, the Vulcans of Star Trek are also capable of performing a technique known as the Vulcan mind meld, which constitutes communication with another individual through a more limited form of telepathy (physical contact by hand is necessary for the telepathic connection). 
 In the novel Ender's Game, the "Buggers" are an alien species in which their queen can telepathically communicate with every member of her species, but no humans except Ender. The inability of the two species to effectively communicate serves as a critical element of the novel's plot.

See also 

 Alien language
 Astrolinguistics

References

External links
 A Primer In SF XENOLINGUISTICS , by Justin B. Rye

Language
 
Alien language